Girl Meets Farm is an American cooking television series that airs on Food Network, and is presented by cookbook author Molly Yeh. The series features Yeh cooking Midwestern farm meals sometimes influenced by her Jewish and Chinese heritage, primarily at her farm on the Minnesota-North Dakota border.

Girl Meets Farm officially premiered on June 24, 2018. The show was renewed for a third season on March 12, 2019, which premiered on March 31.

Episodes

Season 1 (2018)

Season 2 (2018)

Season 3 (2019)

Season 4 (2019)

Notes

References

External links
 
 
 Bodega Pictures

2010s American cooking television series
2018 American television series debuts
American Chinese cuisine
English-language television shows
Jewish American cuisine
Food Network original programming
Food reality television series
Rural Jewish culture